Butis is a genus of fishes in the family Butidae found in fresh, brackish, and marine waters from the Indian Ocean coast of Africa through Southeast Asia to the Pacific islands and Australia.

Species
The recognized species in this genus are:
 Butis amboinensis (Bleeker, 1853) 
 Butis butis (F. Hamilton, 1822) (crazy fish, duckbill sleeper)
 Butis gymnopomus (Bleeker, 1853)
 Butis humeralis (Valenciennes, 1837) (olive flathead-gudgeon)
 Butis koilomatodon (Bleeker, 1849) (mud sleeper)
 Butis melanostigma (Bleeker, 1849) (black-spotted gudgeon)

References

 
Butidae
Taxonomy articles created by Polbot